Autocyrota is a monotypic snout moth genus. Its only species, Autocyrota diacma, is found in the Republic of the Congo. Both the genus and the species were first described by Edward Meyrick in 1933.

References

Phycitinae
Monotypic moth genera
Moths of Africa